Parvez Ali is an Indian politician and member of Uttar Pradesh Legislative Council He represents the Constituency Moradabad Bijnor Party of member Samajwadi Party

References 

Living people
Year of birth missing (living people)
Uttar Pradesh Legislative Council
Samajwadi Party politicians
Moradabad
Samajwadi Party politicians from Uttar Pradesh